Angelo Grimaldi, O.P. (1630–1682) was a Roman Catholic prelate who served as Titular Bishop of Methone (1679–1682) and Auxiliary Bishop of Albano (1679–1682).

Biography
Angelo Grimaldi was born in Genoa, Italy in 1630 and ordained a priest in the Order of Preachers.
On 6 Feb 1679, he was appointed during the papacy of Pope Innocent XI as Titular Bishop of Methone (1679–1682) and Auxiliary Bishop of Albano.
On 23 Apr 1679, he was consecrated bishop by Francesco Barberini, Cardinal-Bishop of Ostia e Velletri, with Angelo della Noca, Archbishop Emeritus of Rossano, and Domenico Gianuzzi, Titular Bishop of Dioclea in Phrygia, serving as co-consecrators. 
He served as Auxiliary Bishop of Albano until his death on 10 Apr 1682.
 
While bishop, he was the principal co-consecrator of Matteo Fazio, Bishop of Patti (1682).

See also 
Catholic Church in Italy

References 

17th-century Italian Roman Catholic bishops
Bishops appointed by Pope Innocent XI
1630 births
1682 deaths
Dominican bishops